The major sports of youth street sports and culture movement Ghetto Games are 3x3 basketball, 3x3 football, 3x3 floorball, pancration - Ghetto Fight, street dance - Ghetto dance and such extreme sports as BMX, skateboarding, extreme inline, scooters, wakeboarding, velo trial and velo trial bikes and freestyle motorcycle. Individual sports might have direction as well, such as 1vs1 football and 1vs1 basketball. The event also includes the musical project similar to X-Factor.

Ghetto Games was founded by former Latvian basketball player Raimonds Elbakjans.

The Mission

The mission of Ghetto Games is to create a platform for young people to develop their talents - where they can open up physically and morally as well as create a place where people who were dropped out of school or rejected from other places, would feel accepted.

Ghetto Art
Vladislav Lakse joined Ghetto Games in the first season and did his first form of digital art about street basketball which was later used in Ghetto street art.

Ghetto Football Euro League 2022
Eleven 3x3 street football tournaments, in eleven European countries - "Ghetto Football Euro League 2022" will take place in eleven countries - Italy, Croatia, Hungary, Czech Republic, Belgium, the Netherlands, Denmark, Germany, Poland, Lithuania, the final, in the capital of Latvia, Riga.

Honors
 2018 UEFA Grassroots Awards winners: Bronze Award

Filmography
 From Ghetto to the Olympics Gold (2022)
 From Ghetto to the Olympics (2019)
 Intelligent Hooligans 
 This is only beginning (2013) 
 This is our freedom (2012) 
 500 events in 90 days (2010)

References

External links
Official Website of Ghetto Games

Organisations based in Latvia